William Schaefer was an American wrestler. He competed in the men's freestyle welterweight at the 1904 Summer Olympics.

References

External links
 

Year of birth missing
Year of death missing
American male sport wrestlers
Olympic wrestlers of the United States
Wrestlers at the 1904 Summer Olympics
Place of birth missing